Anatomy of t.A.T.u. (Anatomyia TATU, or А.Н.А.Т.О.М.И.Я.), is a documentary film directed by Vitaly Mansky, chronicling the lives of the group t.A.T.u. on their promotional tour in USA, but most of all, revealing the girls' true lives, including their sexuality.

The movie's main selling point was the revelation that neither Julia Volkova nor Lena Katina were lesbians. They stated that it was all just a marketing strategy; a brainchild developed by their manager, Ivan Shapovalov. Volkova said that before t.A.T.u., she had never thought about girls in that way, but during t.A.T.u. she had fallen in love with another girl, although the physical aspect had not developed beyond kissing.

The film also showed that both girls are religious. Katina visits church and goes to confession regularly; she believes that her career forces her to do many sinful things. Volkova, on the other hand, is ready to do anything perceived as popular in the musical world. She isn't afraid of anything besides loneliness. Katina is shyer, and said that she wouldn't ever have sex with anyone on camera.

Another aspect of the documentary was drug use. Volkova admitted to having once taken heroin as part of a bet to prove that she had "no need for such things in [her] life." The film also included scenes of Ivan Shapovalov and Beata Ardeeva smoking marijuana. Also, it shows Volkova and Katina smoking regular cigarettes, which they do even though it may negatively affect their voices.

The film reveals that Volkova had problems with her voice for a long period, which nearly killed the group. Besides this, Volkova admitted that she also had an unwanted pregnancy, and she was forced to have an abortion. Volkova also admitted to having a boyfriend, a married man, Pavel 'Pasha' Sidorov.

This documentary stirred debate on topic of censorship on Russian television due to its slogan, Hui Voine!, the use of foul language, and depictions of drug use.

Home media
After the show premiered on television, a DVD was made available for a limited time in 2004. It used the original Russian audio track, but included English subtitles.

External links
 

T.A.T.u.
Documentary films about women in music
Russian documentary films